Gordonvale railway station is located on the North Coast line in Queensland, Australia. It serves the town of Gordonvale. The station has one platform. Opposite the platform lies a passing loop and a large sugar mill.

Services
Gordonvale is served by Traveltrain's Spirit of Queensland service.

References

External links

Gordonvale station Queensland's Railways on the Internet

Regional railway stations in Queensland
North Coast railway line, Queensland
Gordonvale, Queensland
Buildings and structures in Far North Queensland